Salmon fly patterns (not to be confused with flies for Atlantic Salmon) are an important collection of artificial flies used by fly anglers to imitate nymphal and adult forms of Pteronarcys californica a giant stonefly or salmon fly.  Salmon flies are common in high gradient, freestone rivers and streams from Western Canada throughout the Western U.S. to Mexico in the Rocky Mountains and coastal mountain ranges.  Nymphs live for three to five years before adult emergence which typically occurs in late Spring or early summer. The long lifespan of the nymphal form provides year-round angling opportunities for fly anglers.

Adult imitative patterns

{{columns-list|colwidth=35em|

As described in Flies for Trout (1993), Dick Stewart & Farrow Allen
 Bird's Stonefly
 Fluttering Orange Stone
 Foam Stone
 Jug Head
 MacSalmon
 Rainy's Stonefly
 Sofa Pillow Improved
As described in Trout Country Flies (2002), Bruce Staples
 Bar-X Stone
 Bing's Fluttering Stone
 Boehme Salmonfly
 Buck's Stonefly
 Bunyan Bug
 Doc's Stonefly
 Fluttering Stonefly
 Henry's Fork Salmonfly
 Jacklin Giant Salmonfly
 LC Moose
 Marcella's Trout Fly
 Montana Stone (Charlie Brooks)
 Nature Stone Dry
 Parks' Salmonfly
 Picket Pin
 Sofa Pillow
 Stonefly Adult
 Super Sofa Pillow
 Troth Salmon Fly
As described in Yellowstone Country Flies (2013), Walter J. Wiese
 Prom Queen Salmonfly
}}

Adult attractor patterns
As described in Flies for Trout (1993), Dick Stewart & Farrow Allen
 Stimulator
As described in Trout Country Flies'' (2002), Bruce Staples
 Abbey
 Dry Muddler
 Madam X
 Bloody Butcher

Nymph patterns

Notes

Artificial flies